Glendale is an unincorporated community in Hardin County, Kentucky, United States. It is included in the Elizabethtown, Kentucky Metropolitan Statistical Area.

History

Railroad
Once named Walker's Station for Lewis B. Walker's store, when a post office was established on March 2, 1859.  Lewis B. Walker was the first postmaster. It was named Glendale for the new train station, which in turn was possibly named for the hometown of a railroad employee.  A train depot was built in Glendale along the Louisville and Nashville Railroad tracks in 1864.  It was remodeled into a "combination station" in 1905 and the old station became a freight room with two waiting rooms for passengers and an agent's office.  The original depot was torn down in the 1930s.

The passage of the train is still a familiar sound and site in Glendale.  Those who grew up in Glendale can remember the train coming through to pick up and drop off mail.  As the train passed slowly through town, the person in charge of mail on the train would throw out a large bag of mail for the Glendale postmaster to pick up.  For outgoing mail, the Glendale postmaster would hang a mailbag known as a "catcher pouch" on a "mail hook", located next to the train tracks, before the train's scheduled arrival.  The catcher pouch was grabbed by a catcher mechanism (mechanical arm) as the train passed by.  This was known as "mail on the fly" because the train could deliver and receive mail without stopping.

Legend has it that Jesse James once robbed the Glendale bank.

Education
Glendale once had a college known as Lynnland.  In 1867 a charter was issued under the name of Lynnland Female Institute.  The school opened in September of the same year under the guidance of a Baptist preacher, Rev. Colson.  After two years of operation, the college was taken over by Confederate Brigadier General William F. Perry.  The school was then converted into Lynnland Military Institution which operated until 1879.  From 1879 until 1888 it became the residence of the Samuel Sprigg family.  In 1888, it reopened as Lynnland Female Institute until it was sold to the Kentucky Baptist Education Society in 1905.  In 1915, it became the Kentucky Baptist Children's Home.  Many Glendaleans knew it as the Glendale Children's Home until it officially closed in 2009.  Many outstanding young men and women came through the Glendale Children's Home where they received loving care by those who lived and worked there.  They attended Gilead Baptist Church (organized 1824) which was located nearby.  The children also attended school at Glendale Elementary and High School.  Glendale became East Hardin Elementary and High School in 1964.  East Hardin Elementary was shut down in 1971 as East Hardin High continued to operate.  East Hardin High School was converted into East Hardin Middle School in the 1990s and continues to operate today.  East Hardin High School (Rebels) consolidated with its Stephensburg, Kentucky rival school West Hardin High School (Lakers) to form Central Hardin High School (Bruins); after the Hardin County district opened a third high school in 2001 (John Hardin High School in Radcliff), Glendale remained in the Central Hardin attendance zone.

First to Organize for Kentucky Women's Rights
Glendale was the site of the first organized woman suffrage association in Kentucky. Mary Barr Clay included in her summary of Kentucky women's suffrage activities in the History of Woman Suffrage included a report given in The Revolution from Glendale:  "We organized here an association with twenty members the first of October, 1867, and now have fifty. We hope soon to have the whole of Hardin county, and by the close of another year the whole of the State of Kentucky, enlisted on the side of woman's rights."

Cultural Events and Food 
Glendale is host to the annual Glendale Crossing Festival on the third Saturday of October. The festival is well known for the wide variety of antiques and crafts for sale.

The Whistle Stop is the most famous restaurant in Glendale and is situated along the rail road. The Whistle Stop was created from expanding a lunch business within the existing hardware store in Glendale. The owners, James and Idell Sego, opened the restaurant in 1975. In 2005, this restaurant obtained new owners, Mike and Lynn Cummins. They continue to operate it to this day.

Glendale has a special zoning regulation that keeps out businesses such as fast food restaurant chains from its core downtown business area.

Economy
In April 2009, Governor Steve Beshear announced that a consortium of least 50 corporations  — collectively known as the National Alliance for Advanced Transportation Batteries, or NAATBatt — identified a  state-owned industrial site, for a project to bring a lithium-ion battery manufacturing plant for hybrid and electric cars, its headquarters and engineering facilities to Glendale.
The project was expected to take 18 months, and potentially employing 1,500-2,000 people.

The site was eventually announced as the location of a new Ford battery production facility in September 2021. BlueOval SK, a joint venture between Ford and Korean company SK Innovation, plans to invest $5.8 billion in a facility tentatively known as BlueOval SK Battery Park, consisting of two plants. The complex, scheduled to open in 2025, is expected to employ about 5,000 and will produce batteries to support future Ford and Lincoln electric vehicles.

Climate
The climate in this area is characterized by hot, humid summers and generally mild to cool winters.  According to the Köppen Climate Classification system, Glendale has a humid subtropical climate, abbreviated "Cfa" on climate maps.

References

External links
 CHARGING INTO THE GREEN ECONOMY - June 2009

Unincorporated communities in Kentucky
Unincorporated communities in Hardin County, Kentucky
Elizabethtown metropolitan area